Spanish Sahara, officially the Spanish Possessions in the Sahara from 1884 to 1958, then Province of the Sahara between 1958 and 1976, was the name used for the modern territory of Western Sahara when it was occupied and ruled by Spain between 1884 and 1976. It had been one of the most recent acquisitions, as well as one of the last remaining holdings, of the Spanish Empire, which had once extended from the Americas to the Spanish East Indies.

Between 1946 and 1958, the Spanish Sahara was amalgamated with the nearby Spanish-protected Cape Juby and Spanish Ifni to form a new colony, Spanish West Africa. This was reversed during the Ifni War when Ifni and the Sahara became provinces of Spain separately, two days apart, while Cape Juby was ceded to Morocco in the peace deal.

Spain gave up its Saharan possession following Moroccan demands and international pressure, mainly from United Nations resolutions regarding decolonisation. There was internal pressure from the native Sahrawi population, through the Polisario Front, and the claims of Morocco and Mauritania. After gaining independence in 1956, Morocco laid claim to the territory as part of its historic pre-colonial territory. Mauritania claimed the territory for a number of years on a historical basis, but dropped all claims in 1979.

In 1975, Morocco occupied much of the territory, now known as Western Sahara, but the Polisario Front, promoting the sovereignty of an independent Sahrawi Arab Democratic Republic (SADR), fought a guerrilla war for 16 years against Morocco. In 1991, the UN negotiated a ceasefire and has tried to arrange negotiations and a referendum to let the population vote on its future. Morocco controls most of the Atlantic coast and most of the landmass, population and natural resources of Western Sahara.

Spanish period 

At the Berlin Conference (1884–1885), the European powers were establishing the rules for setting up zones of influence or protection in Africa, and Spain declared 'a protectorate of the African coast' from Cape Blanc to Cape Bojador on 26 December 1884. It officially informed the other powers in writing on 14 January 1885. It began establishing trading posts and a military presence. In July 1885, King Alfonso XII appointed Emilio Bonelli commissioner of the Río de Oro with civil and military authority. On 6 April 1887, the area was incorporated into the Captaincy General of the Canary Islands for military purposes. In the summer of 1886, under the sponsorship of the Spanish Society of Commercial Geography, Julio Cervera Baviera, Felipe Rizzo (1823–1908) and Francisco Quiroga (1853–1894) traversed the territory, which was called Río de Oro, and made topographical and astronomical observations. At the time, geographers had not mapped the territory and its features were not widely known. Their trek is considered the first scientific expedition in that part of the Sahara.

On entering the territory in 1884, Spanish forces were immediately challenged by stiff resistance from the indigenous Sahrawi tribes, Saharan Berbers who lived in many oases and coastal villages. The indigenous people worked mainly in fishing and camel herding, and speak the Hassaniya language, a Bedouin Arabic dialect. A rebellion in 1904 was led by the powerful Smara-based marabout, Shaykh Ma al-'Aynayn, was put down by France in 1910, which ruled neighbouring Algeria. This was followed by a wave of uprisings under Ma al-Aynayn's sons, grandsons and other political leaders.

In 1886, Spain signed the Treaty of Idjil, by which the Emirate of Adrar ceded the land of the colony to Spain. This treaty was of no legal value, since the Emir had no claim to the territory, the Spanish 'invented' a claim which the Emir could, with no harm to himself, immediately cede.

Morocco asserts that the territory was under Moroccan royal sovereignty at the time when the Spanish claimed it in 1884. The country raises to back its claims two sixteenth-century treaties, the Treaty of Alcáçovas and the Treaty of Cintra, between Spain and Portugal, where both countries recognize that the authority of Morocco extended beyond Cabo Bojador. Other treaties extending the authority further south are also raised, like the one between the Sharifian sultanate and Spain of 1 March 1767 or the Anglo-Moroccan Agreement of 13 March 1895. However, the International Court of Justice found in their Advisory opinion on Western Sahara of 1975 that those treaties only proved ties of allegiance (Bay'ah) between this territory and the Kingdom of Morocco, and were not legal ties extending to sovereignty over the territory.

The borders of the territory were not clearly defined until treaties between Spain and France in the early 20th century. Spanish Sahara was created from the Spanish territories of Río de Oro and Saguia el-Hamra in 1924. It was not part of the areas known as Spanish Morocco and was administered separately.

Modern history 

After gaining independence in 1956, Morocco laid claim to Spanish Sahara as part of its historic pre-colonial territory. In 1957, the Moroccan Army of Liberation nearly occupied the small territory of Ifni, north of Spanish Sahara, during the Ifni War. The Spanish sent a regiment of paratroopers from the nearby Canary Islands and repelled the attacks. With the assistance of the French, Spain soon re-established control in the area through Operaciones Teide-Ecoubillon (Spanish name) / Opérations Ecouvillon (French name).

Spain tried to suppress resistance politically. It forced some of the previously nomadic inhabitants of Spanish Sahara to settle in certain areas, and the rate of urbanisation was increased. In 1958, Spain united the territories of Saguia el-Hamra and Río de Oro to form the overseas province of Spanish Sahara, while ceding the province of the Cape Juby strip (which included Villa Bens) in the same year to Morocco.

In the 1960s, Morocco continued to claim Spanish Sahara. It gained agreement by the United Nations to add the territory to the list of territories to be decolonised. In 1969, Spain ceded Ifni to Morocco, but continued to retain Spanish Sahara.

In 1967, Spanish rule was challenged by the Harakat Tahrir, a protest movement secretly organised by the Moroccan government. Spain suppressed the 1970 Zemla Intifada.

In 1973, the Polisario Front was formed in a revival of militant Sahrawi nationalism. The Front's guerrilla army grew rapidly, and Spain lost effective control over most of the territory by early 1975. Its effort to found a political rival, the Partido de Unión Nacional Saharaui (PUNS), met with little success. Spain proceeded to co-opt tribal leaders by setting up the Djema'a, a political institution loosely based on traditional Sahrawi tribal leaders. The Djema'a members were hand-picked by the authorities, but given privileges in return for rubber-stamping Madrid's decisions.

In the winter of 1975, just before the death of its long-time dictator Generalissimo Francisco Franco, Spain was confronted with an intensive campaign of territorial demands from Morocco and, to a lesser extent, from Mauritania. These culminated in the Marcha Verde ('Green March'), where a mass demonstration of 350 000 people coordinated by the Moroccan Government advanced several kilometres into the Western Sahara territory, bypassing the International Court of Justice's Advisory opinion on Western Sahara that had been issued three weeks prior. After negotiating the Madrid Accords with Morocco and Mauritania, Spain withdrew its forces and citizens from the territory.

Morocco and Mauritania took control of the region. Mauritania later surrendered its claim after fighting an unsuccessful war against the Polisario Front. In the process of annexing the region, Morocco started fighting the Polisario Front, and after sixteen years, the UN negotiated a cease-fire in 1991. Today, the sovereignty of the territory remains in dispute between Morocco and the Sahrawi people, and referendum has not been possible to date due to dispute over who can vote.

Present status 

Western Sahara is listed by the United Nations (UN) as a non-decolonized territory and is thus included in the United Nations list of non-self-governing territories. Under international law, Western Sahara is not a legal part of Morocco and it remains under the international laws of military occupation.

Moroccan settlers currently make up more than two thirds of the inhabitants of the territory. Under international law, Morocco's transfer of its own civilians into occupied territory is in direct violation of Article 49 of the Fourth Geneva Convention.

UN peace efforts have been directed at holding a referendum on independence among the Sahrawi population, but this has not yet taken place. The African Union (AU) and more than 80 governments consider the territory to be the sovereign (albeit occupied) state of the Sahrawi Arab Democratic Republic (SADR), with a government-in-exile backed by the Polisario Front.

See also 
List of colonial governors of Spanish Sahara
International Court of Justice Advisory Opinion on Western Sahara
History of Western Sahara
Moroccan Army of Liberation
Southern Provinces
Tiris al-Gharbiyya
Sahrawi Arab Democratic Republic
Spanish West Africa

References 

 
Sahara
History of Western Sahara
Former colonies in Africa
Sahara
States and territories established in 1884
States and territories disestablished in 1976
1884 establishments in Africa
1976 disestablishments in Africa
1884 establishments in the Spanish Empire
1976 disestablishments in Spain
19th century in Western Sahara
20th century in Western Sahara
Former provinces of Spain
Morocco–Spain relations